Paulo Menezes may refer to:

 Paulo Menezes (footballer) (born 1982), footballer from Brazil
 Paulo Menezes (football coach) (born 1978), Portuguese football manager
 Paulo Barreto Menezes (1925–2016), Brazilian civil engineer and politician